Isaiah Msibi (born February 15, 1984) is a Swazi middle-distance runner. He represented Swaziland at the 2008 Summer Olympics in Beijing, and competed in the men's 1500 metres. Msibi ran in the second heat of the competition, finishing in twelfth place, with a personal best time of 3:51.35.

References

External links
 
 NBC 2008 Olympics profile

Swazi male middle-distance runners
Living people
Olympic athletes of Eswatini
Athletes (track and field) at the 2008 Summer Olympics
1984 births